Kindness Is the New Rock and Roll is the third studio album by British indie rock band Peace, released on 4 May 2018. Kindness Is the New Rock and Roll was produced by Simone Felice.

Critical reception

Kindness Is the New Rock and Roll received generally positive reviews upon release, gaining a score of 8/10 with NME, and 8/10 from The Independent, and positive reviews from DIY, who stated that Harry Koisser was "the ideal frontperson: a head mix of swaggering bombast, fashionable loucheness and your mate down the local spewing inspirational Tumblr quotes at closing time". However, Q gave the album a more mixed review of 6/10, saying that they "occasionally slip into boilerplate territory". Most reviewers believed it was a return to form for the band.

Track listing

Personnel 
 Harrison Koisser – lead vocals, guitar
 Samuel Koisser – bass guitar, backing vocals
 Douglas Castle – lead guitar
 Dominic Boyce – drums, backing vocals

References 

Peace (band) albums
2018 albums